1st otdeleniya sovkhoza 'Maslovskiy' is a rural locality (a settlement) in Nikolskoye Rural Settlement of Novousmansky District, Russia. The population was  1185 as of 2010. The settlement is the administrative center of the Nikolsky rural settlement. There are 35 streets.

Geography 
The settlement is located 20 km southwest of Novaya Usman (the district's administrative centre) by road. Maslovka is the nearest rural locality.

References 

Rural localities in Novousmansky District